G. Ramachandran (born 1931) is a former president of the Singapore Indian Chamber of Commerce and Industry (SICCI).

G. Ramachandran may also refer to: 
G. Ramachandran (producer) (1954-2021), an Indian film producer
G. Ramachandran (social reformer) (1904–1995), a soldier for the Gandhian cause, social reformer and teacher
G. N. Ramachandran (1922–2001), Indian physicist

See also
M. G. Ramachandran